The Antwerp Diamonds are a former amateur American football team based in Antwerp. The Diamonds were members of the Flemish American Football League (FAFL) conference in the Belgian Football League (BFL).

History

2002 season

2002 Playoffs

2003 season

2004 season

2004 Playoffs

2005 season

2005 Playoffs

2006-2007

2008 season

2008 Playoffs

2009-2010

2011 season

2012 season

2012 Playoffs

2013 season

2014 season

Achievements
Overview achievements BFL Teams

References

External links
 website Diamonds

American football teams in Belgium
1989 establishments in Belgium
American football teams established in 1989